Camila Estico (born ) is a Seychellois model and beauty pageant winner. She won the 2014 edition of Miss Seychelles, earning her the right to represent Seychelles at Miss World 2014.

Early life
Camila was born to Cuban mother and Seychellois father. She grew up on the island of Seychelles until she turned 14 years of age and later she and her family moved to the United States of America. There, at Tampa, Florida, she attended Howard W. Baker Performing Arts High School until 2009. After a semester break she went to the New York City where she took a two-year program at the Alvin Ailey Dance School. As soon as she came back from here New York trip she returned to Florida to pursue an Associate of Arts in Business Administration at the Hillsborough Community College. She returned to her homeland after 9 years of being an American.

Pageantry

Miss Seychelles 2014
On 1 June 2014, she was crowned winner of Miss Seychelles 2014 by Agnes Gerry at a grand ceremony at Savoy Resort and Spa, Seychelles. At the same pageant she won Miss Talent and Miss Photogenic.

Miss World 2014
Estico represented Seychelles at Miss World 2014, reaching the talent competition quarter-finals.

Acting career
Camila Estico is one of the actresses in A Love Like This, a movie which was shot on both Seychelles and Sri Lanka.

References

1992 births
Living people
Hillsborough Community College alumni
Seychellois beauty pageant winners
Seychellois female models
Female models from Florida
People from Tampa, Florida
Seychellois people of Cuban descent
21st-century American women
Miss World 2014 delegates